Josef Wagner may refer to:

 Josef Wagner (composer) (1856–1908), Austrian composer
 Josef Wagner (cyclist) (1916–2003), Swiss cyclist
 Josef Wagner (Gauleiter) (1899–1945), Nazi official in the Third Reich
 Josef Wagner the Younger (1901–1957), Czech painter and sculptor
 Josef Wagner (painter) (born 1938), Czech painter and graphic artist
 Josef Wagner (water polo) (1886-?), Austrian Olympic water polo player

See also
 Joseph Wagner (disambiguation)